Card or The Card may refer to:

In general
 Various types of plastic cards:
By type
Magnetic stripe card
Chip card
Digital card
By function
Payment card
Credit card
Debit card
EC-card
Identity card
European Health Insurance Card
Driver's license
 Playing card, a card used in games
 Printed circuit board
 Punched card, a piece of stiff paper that holds digital data represented by the presence or absence of holes in predefined positions. 
In communications
 Postcard
 Greeting card, an illustrated piece of card stock featuring an expression of friendship or other sentiment
 , in mathematical notation, a function that returns the cardinality of a set
 Card, a tool for carding, the cleaning and aligning of fibers
 Sports terms
 Card (sports), the lineup of the matches in an event
 Penalty card

As a proper name

People with the name
 Card (surname)

Companies
 Cards Corp, a South Korean internet company

Arts and entertainment
 "The Card" (The New Twilight Zone), a TV  episode
 The Card, a 1911 novel by Arnold Bennett
 The Card (1922 film), based on the novel
 The Card (1952 film), based on the novel
 The Card (musical), based on the novel
 "The Card", an episode of SpongeBob SquarePants (season 6)
 The Card, a 2012 novel written by Graham Rawle
 The Deck of Cards, a recitation song

Sport

Sports teams
 Arizona Cardinals, a National Football League team nicknamed the "Cards"
 St. Louis Cardinals, a Major League Baseball team nicknamed the "Cards"
 Louisville Cardinals, the sports teams of the University of Louisville, nicknamed the "Cards"
 Woking F.C., an association football club, based in Surrey, England, nicknamed the "Cards"

As an acronym

Finance and government
 Community Assistance for Reconstruction, Development, and Stabilisation (CARDS) programme, the European Union's main financial assistance instrument to the western Balkans
 Credit CARD Act of 2009 (Credit Card Accountability, Responsibility, and Disclosure Act of 2009), signed into law in 2009 by President Obama

Healthcare and science
 Caspase recruitment domain or CARD domain, an interaction motif found in a wide array of proteins
 Center for Autism and Related Disorders, an applied behavior analysis provider
 Wolfson Centre for Age-Related Diseases
 The Comprehensive Antibiotic Resistance Database (CARD)

Other uses of the acronym
 Campaign Against Racial Discrimination, British organization, founded in 1964, that lobbied for race relations legislation
 American Committee for Devastated France (Comité Américain pour les Régions Dévastées de France), an organization of American women volunteers who helped France recover from 
 Collegiate Aerial Robotics Demonstration, a college-level FIRST competition

See also 

 
 Card game (disambiguation)
 Card holder (disambiguation)
 Carding (disambiguation)
 Carte (disambiguation)